In mathematical optimization, Wolfe duality, named after Philip Wolfe, is type of dual problem in which the objective function and constraints are all differentiable functions.  Using this concept a lower bound for a minimization problem can be found because of the weak duality principle.

Mathematical formulation 
For a minimization problem with inequality constraints,

 

the Lagrangian dual problem is

 

where the objective function is the Lagrange dual function. The problem  

 

is called the Wolfe dual problem.  This problem employs the KKT conditions as a constraint.  Also, the equality constraint  is nonlinear in general, so the Wolfe dual problem may be a nonconvex optimization problem. In any case, weak duality holds.

See also 
 Lagrangian duality
 Fenchel duality

References 

Convex optimization